Yogendra Kumar Joshi from the Georgia Institute of Technology, Atlanta, GA was named Fellow of the Institute of Electrical and Electronics Engineers (IEEE) in 2012 for contributions to microfabricated cooling devices.

References

External links
 Georgia Tech Biography

Fellow Members of the IEEE
Living people
Year of birth missing (living people)
Place of birth missing (living people)
Georgia Tech faculty
American electrical engineers